Laura van den Bruel, known as Iris or Airis (born 19 January 1995), is a Belgian singer.

Eurovision
On 18 November 2011, it was announced by Vlaamse Radio- en Televisieomroeporganisatie (VRT), that Iris would represent Belgium in the Eurovision Song Contest 2012. She performed the song "Would You?", finished second last in the first semi-final, and did not make the Eurovision final. In 2014, she returned to the contest as a member of the Belgian jury.

Discography

Albums

Singles

References

Footnotes

Sources

External links

Eurovision Song Contest entrants for Belgium
Eurovision Song Contest entrants of 2012
People from Antwerp Province
1995 births
Living people
21st-century Belgian women singers
21st-century Belgian singers